Watongia is an extinct genus of non-mammalian synapsids from Middle Permian of Oklahoma. Only one species has been described, Watongia meieri, from the Chickasha Formation. It was assigned to family Gorgonopsidae by Olson and to Eotitanosuchia by Carroll. Reisz and collaborators assigned the genus in Varanopidae. It was a contemporary of its closest relative, the much smaller Varanodon; the two may possibly represent growth stages of a single animal.

See also

 List of pelycosaurs

References

External links
 The main groups of non-mammalian synapsids at Mikko's Phylogeny Archive

Varanopids
Prehistoric synapsid genera
Guadalupian synapsids of North America
Taxa named by Everett C. Olson
Fossil taxa described in 1974